Table Tennis at the 2015 Island Games was held at the Geoff Reed Table Tennis Centre, Jersey from 28 June to 3 July.

Medal Table

Results

References 

Table tennis at multi-sport events
2015 Island Games